Ristella is a genus of skinks endemic to the Western Ghats of southwestern India. They are commonly known as cat skinks because of their retractile claws. This genus can be instantly identified by the presence of only four fingers in forelimbs in all the species (instead of the usual five). All the members look more or less similar and are drab dark brown to blackish in complexion with paler undersides. This poorly known groups of lizards are diurnal, insectivorous, terrestrial to semi fossorial in habits. They inhabit deep leaf-litter and grasslands in montane forests and rainforests.

Description
Palatine and pterygoid bones in contact on the median line of the palate, which is toothless;palatine notch small, far behind, corresponding to the posterior notch of the tongue. Teeth conical. Eyelids well developed, scaly. Ear-opening distinct. Nostril pierced in a single nasal; no supranasals; prefrontals small or coalesced; frontoparietals and interparietal distinct. Limbs well developed, anterior with 4, posterior with 5 digits; claws completely retractile into a large compressed sheath formed of one large scale cleft beneath.

Geographic range
All species in this genus are endemic to the Western Ghats hill-tracts of southwestern India. Currently these skinks have been recorded from the southern and central Western Ghats of Tamil Nadu, Kerala and Karnataka states. Hill ranges such as Travancore hills, High Ranges, Anaimalai, Nilgiris, Palni Hills, Coorg, Canara and Goa Ghats have been known to harbour these lizards.

Key to species
A. A pair of small prefrontals; frontonasal forming a suture with frontal.
a. Ear-opening much larger than nostril; dorsal scales feebly bi- or tricarinate.
R. rurkii
b. Ear-opening not, or but slightly, larger than nostril; dorsal scales sharply bicarinate.
R. travancorica
B. Two azygous shields between rostral and frontal.
a. 22 to 24 scales round middle of body; adpressed limbs not meeting.
R. guentheri
b 26 scales round body; adpressed limbs meeting or overlapping.
R. beddomii

Species
The following four species are recognized:

Ristella beddomii Boulenger, 1887 – Beddome's cat skink
Ristella guentheri Boulenger, 1887 – Günther's ristella
Ristella rurkii Gray, 1839 – Rurk's ristella
Ristella travancorica (Beddome, 1870) – Travancore cat skink, Travancore ristella

Nota bene: A binomial authority in parentheses indicates that the species was originally described in a genus other than Ristella.

References

Further reading
 Gray JE. 1839. Catalogue of the Slender-tongued Saurians, with Descriptions of many new Genera and Species. Ann. Mag. Nat. Hist. [First Series] 2: 331-337. (Genus Ristella, p. 333).
 Ganesh, S.R. (2018). The rediscovery of Rurk's Cat Skink Ristella rurkii Gray, 1839 (Reptilia: Ristellidae) with remarks on distribution and natural history. Journal of Threatened Taxa, 10(10), 12376-12381. https://doi.org/10.11609/jott.3946.10.10.12376-12381

 
Lizard genera
Taxa named by John Edward Gray